The 2015–16 Arizona State Sun Devils men's ice hockey season was the inaugural season of play for the program at the Division I level. The Sun Devils represented Arizona State University and were coached by Greg Powers, in his 7th season.

Season
With a team composed mostly of ACHA players and freshmen, Arizona State was not expected to be competitive in many of their games. From the start it was apparent that ASU's offense wasn't comparable with other Division I programs and the team struggled to score throughout the season. Against their peers, the Sun Devils were able to score multiple goals in only 6 games. After winning the program's first road sweep in mid-November, ASU lost their next 16 games, only arresting their slide when the team took on Division III Wisconsin–Eau Claire.

Despite the bad results, there were few recriminations for the debutant program. Arizona State had little going in their favor in their first season and growing pains were expected for the nascent team.

Recruiting

Roster

As of March 20, 2017.

|}

Standings

Schedule and Results

|-
!colspan=12 style=";" | Exhibition

|-
!colspan=12 style=";" | Regular Season
|-
!colspan=12 style=";" | 

|-
!colspan=12 style=";" | 

|-
!colspan=12 style=";" | Exhibition

Scoring Statistics

Goaltending statistics

Rankings

*USCHO did not release a poll in week 23.

Players drafted into the NHL

2016 NHL Entry Draft
No Arizona State players were selected in the NHL draft.

References

Arizona State Sun Devils men's ice hockey seasons
Arizona State Sun Devils
Arizona State Sun Devils
2015 in sports in Arizona
2016 in sports in Arizona